This article features the 2004 UEFA European Under-19 Championship second qualifying round. Seven group winners qualified for the main tournament in Switzerland.

Teams
The following teams qualified for this round:

12 group winners from the first qualifying round

 
 
 
 
 
 
 
 
 
 
 
 

12 group runners-up from the first qualifying round

 
 
 
 
 
 
 
 
 
 
 
 

1 best group third-place finisher from the first qualifying round

 

3 teams received a bye for the first qualifying round

Group 1
All matches were played in Spain.

Group 2
All matches were played in one country.

Group 3
All matches were played in Slovakia.

Group 4
All matches were played in Slovenia.

Group 5
All matches were played in Turkey.

Group 6
All matches were played in Austria.

Group 7
All matches were played in Belgium.

See also
 2004 UEFA European Under-19 Championship
 2004 UEFA European Under-19 Championship first qualifying round

External links
Results by RSSSF

2
UEFA European Under-19 Championship qualification